Kenneth John Szotkiewicz (last name pronounced sɑkəwɪts, born February 25, 1947) is a former Major League Baseball shortstop, who played in 47 games for the Detroit Tigers in .  Played collegiately for the Georgia Southern Eagles.

Sources

Major League Baseball shortstops
Detroit Tigers players
Rocky Mount Leafs players
Lakeland Tigers players
Montgomery Rebels players
Georgia Southern Eagles baseball players
Toledo Mud Hens players
Midland Cubs players
Wichita Aeros players
Baseball players from Wilmington, Delaware
1947 births
Living people
Salesianum School alumni